was a daimyō in early Edo period, Japan.

Abe Masatsugu was the eldest son of Abe Masakatsu, one of the hereditary retainers of Tokugawa Ieyasu. He was born in Mikawa Province. In 1600, on his father's death, he became head of the Abe clan, and inherited his father's 5,000 koku holding in Hatogaya, Musashi Province. In 1610, he was transferred to Kanuma, Shimotsuke Province. He distinguished himself as a general during the 1614 Siege of Osaka, taking the most enemy heads of any of Ieyasu's generals. He was awarded with the rank of daimyō in 1617, and was given the 30,000 koku Ōtaki Domain in Kazusa Province. In 1619, following the disgrace of the Ōkubo clan, he was reassigned to Odawara Domain (50,000 koku) in Sagami Province. In 1623, he was reassigned, this time to Iwatsuki Domain (55,000 koku) in Mutsu Province, where his descendants remained for the next several generations.

In 1626, he was appointed Osaka jōdai, a position which he held for the next 22 years until his death, and which raised his revenues to 86,000 koku. In 1637, he played an active role in the suppression of the Shimabara Rebellion. On April 22, 1638, he divided his holdings between his sons Abe Shigetsugu (46,000 koku) and Abe Masayoshi (10,000 koku), while retaining the remaining 30,000 koku for himself. Msatsugu died in Osaka in 1647; his grave is at the temple of Zōjō-ji at Shiba in Tokyo.

References 
Spackman, Chris. An Encyclopedia of Japanese History (2009). BiblioLife. .
Mogi, Hitoshi. A Historical Study of the Development of Edo (1959). Cornell University Press
 Papinot, Edmond. (1906) Dictionnaire d'histoire et de géographie du japon. Tokyo: Librarie Sansaisha...Click link for digitized 1906 Nobiliaire du japon (2003)
This article is derived from its corresponding article on the Japanese Wikipedia

|-

|-

|-

|-

Fudai daimyo
Rōjū
1569 births
1647 deaths